The 1993 NCAA Division I Cross Country Championships were the 55th annual NCAA Men's Division I Cross Country Championship and the 13th annual NCAA Women's Division I Cross Country Championship to determine the team and individual national champions of NCAA Division I men's and women's collegiate cross country running in the United States. In all, four different titles were contested: men's and women's individual and team championships.

Held on November 22, 1993, the combined meet was hosted by Lehigh University in Bethlehem, Pennsylvania. The distance for the men's race was 10 kilometers (6.21 miles) while the distance for the women's race was 5 kilometers (3.11 miles). 

Both team national championships were again retained by their respective defending champions: Arkansas for the men (their seventh overall and fourth consecutive) and Villanova for the women (their fifth overall and third consecutive). The two individual champions were Josephat Kapkory (Washington State, 39:32.4) and Carole Zajac (Villanova, 16:40.3); it was Zajac's second consecutive title as well.

Men's title
Distance: 10,000 meters

Men's Team Result (Top 10)

Men's Individual Result (Top 10)

Women's title
Distance: 5,000 meters

Women's Team Result (Top 10)

Women's Individual Result (Top 10)

References
 

NCAA Cross Country Championships
NCAA Division I Cross Country Championships
NCAA Division I Cross Country Championships
NCAA Division I Cross Country Championships
Track and field in Pennsylvania
Sports in Bethlehem, Pennsylvania
Lehigh University